Louis Smolka (born July 16, 1991) is an American mixed martial artist who competes in the bantamweight division. A professional competitor since 2010, he has previously fought for the Ultimate Fighting Championship, California Xtreme Fighting, King of the Cage and Pacific Xtreme Combat. He is also former flyweight champion of both California Xtreme Fighting and Pacific Xtreme Combat.

Mixed martial arts career

Early career
Smolka began his amateur career in 2010 and was able to achieve a 2–1 record in his first year of competition, also winning the X-1 amateur 135 lb. title. He would take nearly a year off before turning professional in 2012. He would pick up wins under the Destiny MMA and King of the Cage banners before moving on to the PXC promotion in late 2012. He would win all four fights he had with PXC and would leave the promotion as the flyweight champion.

Ultimate Fighting Championship
In late 2013, Louis was signed by the UFC and was slated to make his promotional debut against Alp Ozkilic at UFC Fight Night 35 on January 15, 2014.  Smolka was able to come out with a unanimous decision victory.

Smolka later faced Chris Cariaso on May 10, 2014 at UFC Fight Night 40.  Smolka lost the fight via split decision.

Smolka faced Richie Vaculik on November 8, 2014, at UFC Fight Night 55. He won the fight via knockout in the third round, finishing him with a side kick to the face and swarmed on Vaculik til the fight was stopped. The win also earned Smolka his first Performance of the Night bonus award.

Smolka faced Neil Seery on July 11, 2015 at UFC 189. He won the fight by unanimous decision.

Smolka faced Paddy Holohan on October 24, 2015 at UFC Fight Night 76 in the main event. After a back and forth first round featuring creative maneuvers by both men, Smolka was able to establish top position on Holohan midway in round two and deliver a series of shots, prompting Holohan to give up his back. Smolka was then able to lock in the rear-naked choke and secure the victory.

Smolka next faced Ben Nguyen on July 13, 2016 at UFC Fight Night 91. He won the fight via TKO in the second round and was awarded a Performance of the Night bonus.

Smolka was expected to face Sergio Pettis on October 1, 2016 at UFC Fight Night 96. However, Pettis pulled out of the fight citing a minor injury and was replaced by promotional newcomer Brandon Moreno. Smolka lost the fight via submission in the first round.

Smolka faced Ray Borg on December 30, 2016 at UFC 207. At the weigh-ins, Borg missed weight for the bout, coming in at 129.5 pounds. As a result, he was fined 30% of his fight purse, which went to Smolka, who agreed to take a catchweight bout. Smolka lost the fight by unanimous decision.

Smolka faced Tim Elliott on April 15, 2017 at UFC on Fox 24. He lost the fight by unanimous decision. Both participants were awarded Fight of the Night for their performance.

Smolka faced Matheus Nicolau on December 30, 2017 at UFC 219. He lost the fight via unanimous decision.

Post UFC
After being released from UFC in the beginning of 2018, Smolka moved to Irvine, California to train at Team Oyama and try to turn his career around. After getting scolded by his manager, Smolka realized he had a drinking problem that had hindered his career for the last years. Smolka gave up drinking completely and claims to have been sober since January 2018.

Smolka's release from the UFC also prompted him to reconsider his career as a mixed martial artist. Faced with lower salary and limited growth opportunities, Smolka admitted to nearly walking away from MMA.

Smolka faced Tyrone Christian Gorgonia at Gladiator Challenge - MMA Fighting Championship on April 21, 2018. He won the fight via TKO in the first round.

Return to UFC
On November 13, 2018, news surfaced that Smolka has re-signed a four-fight contract with the UFC and faced promotional newcomer Su Mudaerji at UFC Fight Night: Blaydes vs. Ngannou 2 on November 24, 2018. The bout marked Smolka's return to the bantamweight division. Smolka admitted to struggling to make it to the flyweight limit in the past, admitting "I would be depleting myself to pretty close to death." He won the fight via an armbar in round two.

Smolka faced Matt Schnell on March 9, 2019 at UFC Fight Night 146. He lost the fight via a triangle submission in the first round.

Smolka faced Ryan McDonald on September 14, 2019 at UFC Fight Night 158. He won the fight via TKO in the first round.

Smolka was expected to face Davey Grant at UFC on ESPN: Ngannou vs. Rozenstruik on March 28, 2020. Due to the COVID-19 pandemic, the event was eventually postponed, and ultimately the pairing was scrapped.

Smolka faced Casey Kenney on May 30, 2020 at UFC on ESPN: Woodley vs. Burns. He lost the fight via submission through a guillotine choke in round one.

Smolka was scheduled to face José Alberto Quiñónez on November 14, 2020 at UFC Fight Night 182. At the weigh-ins, Smolka weighed in at 139 pounds, three pounds over the bantamweight non-title fight limit. The bout was to proceed at catchweight with Smolka fined 20 percent of his purse, which would go to his opponent Quiñónez. Smolka pulled out of their fights the next day as consequence of the weigh-cut and those bouts were canceled. The bout was left intact and eventually took place at UFC on ESPN 19 on December 5, 2020. Smolka won the fight via technical knockout in round two.

Smolka was scheduled to face  Sean O'Malley  on July 10, 2021  at UFC 264. However, Smolka pulled out of the fight in late-June citing injury and was replaced by promotional newcomer Kris Moutinho.

Smolka faced Vince Morales on December 4, 2021 at  UFC on ESPN 31. He lost the fight via knockout out in round one.

Smolka faced Davey Grant on May 14, 2022 at  UFC on ESPN 36. He lost the bout after getting knocked out in the third round after getting dropped with a leg kick.

Smolka announced on June 7th 2022 that he was “excited to test free agency” via his Twitter, confirming that he had been cut from the UFC.

Personal life
Smolka and his wife Yumi have a daughter, Lucy.

Championships and accomplishments
Pacific Xtreme Combat
Pacific Xtreme Combat Flyweight Championship (One time)
Ultimate Fighting Championship
Performance of the Night (Two times) vs. Richie Vaculik, Ben Nguyen
Fight of the Night (One time) vs. Tim Elliott

Mixed martial arts record

|-
|Loss
|align=center|17–9
|Davey Grant 
|KO (punches)
|UFC on ESPN: Błachowicz vs. Rakić 
| 
|align=center|3
|align=center|0:49
|Las Vegas, Nevada, United States
|
|-
|Loss
|align=center|17–8
|Vince Morales
|KO (punches)
|UFC on ESPN: Font vs. Aldo 
|
|align=center|1
|align=center|2:02
|Las Vegas, Nevada, United States
|
|-
|Win
|align=center|17–7
|José Alberto Quiñónez
|TKO (punches)
|UFC on ESPN: Hermansson vs. Vettori
|
|align=center|2
|align=center|2:15
|Las Vegas, Nevada, United States
|
|-
|Loss
|align=center|16–7
|Casey Kenney
|Submission (guillotine choke)
|UFC on ESPN: Woodley vs. Burns
|
|align=center|1
|align=center|3:03
|Las Vegas, Nevada, United States
|
|-
|Win
|align=center|16–6
|Ryan McDonald
|TKO (punches)
|UFC Fight Night: Cowboy vs. Gaethje 
|
|align=center|1
|align=center|4:43
|Vancouver, British Columbia, Canada
|
|-
|Loss
|align=center|15–6
|Matt Schnell
|Submission (triangle choke)
|UFC Fight Night: Lewis vs. dos Santos 
|
|align=center|1
|align=center|3:18
|Wichita, Kansas, United States
|
|-
|Win
|align=center|15–5
|Su Mudaerji
|Submission (armbar)
|UFC Fight Night: Blaydes vs. Ngannou 2
|
|align=center|2
|align=center|2:07
|Beijing, China
|
|-
|Win
|align=center|14–5
|Kyle Estrada 
|TKO (doctor stoppage)
|CXF 15
|
|align=center|2
|align=center|5:00
|Burbank, California, United States
|
|-
|Win
|align=center|13–5
|Tycen Lynn
|Submission (guillotine choke)
|Destiny MMA: Fight Night 5
|
|align=center|3
|align=center|N/A
|Honolulu, Hawaii, United States
|
|-
|Win
|align=center|12–5
|Tyrone Christian Gorgonia
|TKO (punches)
|Gladiator Challenge: MMA Fighting Championship
|
|align=center|1
|align=center|1:15
|Rancho Mirage, California, United States
|
|-
|Loss
|align=center|11–5
|Matheus Nicolau
|Decision (unanimous)
|UFC 219
|
|align=center|3
|align=center|5:00
|Las Vegas, Nevada, United States
|
|-
|Loss
|align=center|11–4
|Tim Elliott
|Decision (unanimous)
|UFC on Fox: Johnson vs. Reis
|
|align=center|3
|align=center|5:00
|Kansas City, Missouri, United States
|
|-
|Loss
|align=center|11–3
|Ray Borg
|Decision (unanimous)
|UFC 207
|
|align=center|3
|align=center|5:00
|Las Vegas, Nevada, United States
|
|-
|Loss
|align=center|11–2
|Brandon Moreno
|Submission (guillotine choke)
|UFC Fight Night: Lineker vs. Dodson
|
|align=center|1
|align=center|2:23
|Portland, Oregon, United States
|
|-
|Win
|align=center|11–1
|Ben Nguyen
|TKO (punches and elbows)
|UFC Fight Night: McDonald vs. Lineker
|
|align=center|2
|align=center|4:41
|Sioux Falls, South Dakota, United States
|
|-
|Win
|align=center|10–1
|Paddy Holohan
|Submission (rear-naked choke)
|UFC Fight Night: Holohan vs. Smolka 
|
|align=center|2
|align=center|4:09
|Dublin, Ireland
|
|-
|Win
|align=center|9–1
|Neil Seery
|Decision (unanimous)
|UFC 189 
|
|align=center|3
|align=center|5:00
|Las Vegas, Nevada, United States
|
|-
|Win
|align=center|8–1
|Richie Vaculik
|KO (side kick and punches)
|UFC Fight Night: Rockhold vs. Bisping
|
|align=center|3
|align=center|0:18
|Sydney, Australia
|
|-
|Loss
|align=center|7–1
|Chris Cariaso
|Decision (split)
|UFC Fight Night: Brown vs. Silva
|
|align=center|3
|align=center|5:00
|Cincinnati, Ohio, United States
|
|-
|Win
|align=center|7–0
|Alp Ozkilic
|Decision (unanimous)
|UFC Fight Night: Rockhold vs. Philippou
|
|align=center|3
|align=center|5:00
|Duluth, Georgia, United States
|
|-
|Win
|align=center|6–0
|Ale Cali
|TKO (punches)
|Pacific Xtreme Combat 41
|
|align=center|2
|align=center|1:52
|Pasig, Philippines
|
|-
|Win
|align=center|5–0
|Jessie Rafols
|Submission (rear-naked choke)
|Pacific Xtreme Combat 39
|
|align=center|1
|align=center|1:59
|Pasig, Philippines
|
|-
|Win
|align=center|4–0
|Alvin Cacdac
|Submission (rear-naked choke)
|Pacific Xtreme Combat 35
|
|align=center|3
|align=center|3:59
|Pasig, Philippines
|
|-
|Win
|align=center|3–0
|Bryan To Hang Lam
|Submission (armbar) 
|Pacific Xtreme Combat 34
|
|align=center|1
|align=center|3:54
|Quezon City, Philippines
|
|-
|Win
|align=center|2–0
|Kawika Martin
|Submission (D'Arce choke) 
|KOTC - Mana
|
|align=center|2
|align=center|2:53
|Honolulu, Hawaii, United States
|
|-
|Win
|align=center|1–0
|Shane Pacarro
|TKO (doctor stoppage)
|Destiny MMA - Unleashed
|
|align=center|2
|align=center|5:00
|Waipahu, Hawaii, United States
|

See also
 List of male mixed martial artists

External links

References

Living people
American male mixed martial artists
1991 births
Flyweight mixed martial artists
American male karateka
American male judoka
Mixed martial artists utilizing American Kenpo
Mixed martial artists utilizing boxing
Mixed martial artists utilizing judo
Mixed martial artists from Hawaii
Bantamweight mixed martial artists
Ultimate Fighting Championship male fighters